Agrilactobacillus is a genus of lactic acid bacteria.

References

Lactobacillaceae
Bacteria genera